Roch Roszczak  (4 August 1906 - 8 May 1986) was a Polish zoologist. Roszczak worked in Zakład Morfologii Zwierzat at Adam Mickiewicz University in Poznań.

References
Rafalski Jan,  "Dr Roch Roszczak (1906-1986)", Przegląd Zoologiczny, 1988, Volume 32, Issue 3, pages 319-322 (Obituary)

1906 births
1986 deaths
20th-century Polish zoologists
Academic staff of Adam Mickiewicz University in Poznań